Meskina is a 2021 Dutch romantic comedy film. The film was a passion project of Dutch-Moroccan Stand-up comedian Soundos El Ahmadi, who wanted to see more representation of the Moroccan community in Dutch films.

Cast
 Maryam Hassouni as Leyla Idrissi
 Soundos El Ahmadi as Amira, Leyla's older sister
 Rachida Iaallala as Najat, Leyla and Amira's mother
 Olaf Ait Tami as Abdelkarim, Leyla's ex-husband
 Jouman Fattal as Malika, Leyla's cousin
 Oscar Aerts as Klaas, Amira's husband
 Najib Amhali as Ali
 Bilal Wahib as Rayan
 Nasrdin Dchar as Amin
 Vincent Banic as Fabian
 Fahd Larhzaoui as Ibrahim
 Fadua El Akchaoui as Fatima
 Nora Akachar as Farida
 Joy Delima as Patricia
 Siham Bolakhrif as Yasmina
 Sabri Saddik as Yassin
 Yasmin Karssing as Alicia X

Reception 
The film received mostly mixed reviews. Algemeen Dagblad said that the film had too many romcom-clichés and caricatures for the people to feel real. De Volkskrant also mentioned the romcom-clichés and wished the film had more depth to it. However NRC Handelsblad was a bit more positive saying that the film aims for a young audience but with the pace of the jokes could also get other people invested. The film was sold out on its openingweekend.

Controversy 
It is the first film of actor Bilal Wahib after a widely reported incident in which he asked a minor to expose himself on Instagram Live.

References

External links 
 

2021 films
2021 romantic comedy films
Dutch romantic comedy films
2020s Dutch-language films